Polytetrafluoroethylene (PTFE) is a synthetic fluoropolymer of tetrafluoroethylene that has numerous applications. It is one of the best-known and widely applied PFAS. The commonly known brand name of PTFE-based composition is Teflon by Chemours, a spin-off from DuPont, which originally discovered the compound in 1938.

Polytetrafluoroethylene is a fluorocarbon solid, as it is a high-molecular-weight polymer consisting wholly of carbon and fluorine. PTFE is hydrophobic: neither water nor water-containing substances wet PTFE, as fluorocarbons exhibit only small London dispersion forces due to the low electric polarizability of fluorine. PTFE has one of the lowest coefficients of friction of any solid.

Polytetrafluoroethylene is used as a non-stick coating for pans and other cookware. It is non-reactive, partly because of the strength of carbon–fluorine bonds, so it is often used in containers and pipework for reactive and corrosive chemicals. Where used as a lubricant, PTFE reduces friction, wear, and energy consumption of machinery. It is used as a graft material in surgery and as a coating on catheters.

History 

Polytetrafluoroethylene was accidentally discovered in 1938 by Roy J. Plunkett while he was working in New Jersey for DuPont. As Plunkett attempted to make a new chlorofluorocarbon refrigerant, the tetrafluoroethylene gas in its pressure bottle stopped flowing before the bottle's weight had dropped to the point signaling "empty". Since Plunkett was measuring the amount of gas used by weighing the bottle, he became curious as to the source of the weight, and finally resorted to sawing the bottle apart. He found the bottle's interior coated with a waxy white material that was oddly slippery. Analysis showed that it was polymerized perfluoroethylene, with the iron from the inside of the container having acted as a catalyst at high pressure. Kinetic Chemicals patented the new fluorinated plastic (analogous to the already known polyethylene) in 1941, and registered the Teflon trademark in 1945.

By 1948, DuPont, which founded Kinetic Chemicals in partnership with General Motors, was producing over two million pounds (900 tons) of Teflon brand Polytetrafluoroethylene per year in Parkersburg, West Virginia. An early use was in the Manhattan Project as a material to coat valves and seals in the pipes holding highly reactive uranium hexafluoride at the vast K-25 uranium enrichment plant in Oak Ridge, Tennessee.

In 1954, Colette Grégoire, the wife of French engineer Marc Grégoire, urged him to try the material he had been using on fishing tackle on her cooking pans. He subsequently created the first PTFE-coated, non-stick pans under the brand name Tefal (combining "Tef" from "Teflon" and "al" from aluminium). In the United States, Marion A. Trozzolo, who had been using the substance on scientific utensils, marketed the first US-made PTFE-coated pan, "The Happy Pan", in 1961. Non-stick cookware has since become a common household product, now offered by hundreds of manufacturers across the world.

The brand name Zepel was used for promoting its stain-resistance and water-resistance when applied to fabrics.

In the 1990s, it was found that PTFE could be radiation cross-linked above its melting point in an oxygen-free environment. Electron beam processing is one example of radiation processing. Cross-linked Polytetrafluoroethylene has improved high-temperature mechanical properties and radiation stability. This was significant because, for many years, irradiation at ambient conditions has been used to break down Polytetrafluoroethylene for recycling. This radiation-induced chain scission allows it to be more easily reground and reused.

Corona discharge treatment of the surface to increase the energy and improve adhesion has been reported.

Production 
PTFE is produced by free-radical polymerization of tetrafluoroethylene. The net equation is
  n F2C=CF2 → −(F2C−CF2)n−
Because tetrafluoroethylene can explosively decompose to tetrafluoromethane (CF4) and carbon, special apparatus is required for the polymerization to prevent hot spots that might initiate this dangerous side reaction.  The process is typically initiated with persulfate, which homolyzes to generate sulfate radicals:
[O3SO−OSO3]2− ⇌ 2 
The resulting polymer is terminated with sulfate ester groups, which can be hydrolyzed to give OH end-groups.

Granular PTFE is produced via suspension polymerization, where PTFE is suspended in an aqueous medium primarily via agitation and sometimes with the use of a surfactant such as perfluorooctanesulfonic acid (PFOS) or FRD-903 (GenX). PTFE is also synthesized via emulsion polymerization, where a surfactant is the primary means of keeping PTFE in an aqueous medium.

Properties 

PTFE gains its properties from the aggregate effect of carbon-fluorine bonds, as do all fluorocarbons. The only chemicals known to affect these carbon-fluorine bonds are highly reactive metals like the alkali metals, and at higher temperatures also such metals as aluminum and magnesium, and fluorinating agents such as xenon difluoride and cobalt(III) fluoride. At temperatures above  PTFE undergoes depolymerization.

The coefficient of friction of plastics is usually measured against polished steel. PTFE's coefficient of friction is 0.05 to 0.10, which is the third-lowest of any known solid material (aluminium magnesium boride (BAM) being the first, with a coefficient of friction of 0.02; diamond-like carbon being second-lowest at 0.05). PTFE's resistance to van der Waals forces means that it is the only known surface to which a gecko cannot stick. In fact, PTFE can be used to prevent insects from climbing up surfaces painted with the material. PTFE is so slippery that insects cannot get a grip and tend to fall off. For example, PTFE is used to prevent ants from climbing out of formicaria.

Because of its superior chemical and thermal properties, PTFE is often used as a gasket material within industries that require resistance to aggressive chemicals such as pharmaceuticals or chemical processing. However, until the 1990s, PTFE was not known to crosslink like an elastomer, due to its chemical inertness. Therefore, it has no "memory" and is subject to creep. Because of the propensity to creep, the long-term performance of such seals is worse than for elastomers that exhibit zero, or near-zero, levels of creep. In critical applications, Belleville washers are often used to apply continuous force to PTFE gaskets, thereby ensuring a minimal loss of performance over the lifetime of the gasket.

PTFE is an Ultraviolet (UV) transparent polymer. However, when exposed to an excimer laser beam it severely degrades due to heterogeneous photothermal effect.

Processing
Processing PTFE can be difficult and expensive, because the high melting temperature, is above the initial decomposition temperature, . Even when molten, PTFE does not flow due to its exceedingly high melt-viscosity. The viscosity and melting point can be decreased by inclusion of small amount of comonomers such as perfluoro (propylvinyl ether) and hexafluoropropylene (HFP). These cause the otherwise perfectly linear PTFE chain to become branched, reducing its crystallinity. 

Some PTFE parts are made by cold-moulding, a form of compression molding. Here, fine powdered PTFE is forced into a mould under high pressure (10–100 MPa).

Applications and uses

Wire insulation, electronics 
The major application of PTFE, consuming about 50% of production, is for the insulation of wiring in aerospace and computer applications (e.g. hookup wire, coaxial cables).  This application exploits the fact that PTFE has excellent dielectric properties, specifically low group velocity dispersion, especially at high radio frequencies, making it suitable for use as an excellent insulator in connector assemblies and cables, and in printed circuit boards used at microwave frequencies. Combined with its high melting temperature, this makes it the material of choice as a high-performance substitute for the weaker, higher dispersion and lower-melting-point polyethylene commonly used in low-cost applications.

Bearings seals 
In industrial applications, owing to its low friction, PTFE is used for plain bearings, gears, slide plates, seals, gaskets, bushings, and more applications with sliding action of parts, where it outperforms acetal and nylon.

Electrets 
Its extremely high bulk resistivity makes it an ideal material for fabricating long-life electrets, the electrostatic analogues of permanent magnets.

Composites 
PTFE film is also widely used in the production of carbon fiber composites as well as fiberglass composites, notably in the aerospace industry. PTFE film is used as a barrier between the carbon or fiberglass part being built, and breather and bagging materials used to incapsulate the bondment when debulking (vacuum removal of air from between layers of laid-up plies of material) and when curing the composite, usually in an autoclave. The PTFE, used here as a film, prevents the non-production materials from sticking to the part being built, which is sticky due to the carbon-graphite or fiberglass plies being pre-pregnated with bismaleimide resin. Non-production materials such as Teflon, Airweave Breather and the bag itself would be considered F.O.D. (foreign object debris/damage) if left in layup.

Gore-Tex is a brand of expanded PTFE (ePTFE), a material incorporating a fluoropolymer membrane with micropores. The roof of the Hubert H. Humphrey Metrodome in Minneapolis, US, was one of the largest applications of PTFE coatings.  of the material was used in the creation of the white double-layered PTFE-coated fiberglass dome.

Chemically inert liners 
Because of its extreme non-reactivity and high temperature rating, PTFE is often used as the liner in hose assemblies, expansion joints, and in industrial pipe lines, particularly in applications using acids, alkalis, or other chemicals. Its frictionless qualities allow improved flow of highly viscous liquids, and for uses in applications such as brake hoses.

Tensioned Membrane Structures 
PTFE architectural membranes are created by coating a woven glass-fibre base cloth with PTFE, forming one of the strongest and most durable materials used in Tensile structures.  Some notable structures featuring PTFE tensioned membranes include The O2 Arena in London, Moses Mabhida Stadium in South Africa, Metropolitano Stadium in Spain and the Sydney Football Stadium Roof in Australia.

Musical instruments 
PTFE is often found in musical instrument lubrication products; most commonly, valve oil.

Lubricants 
PTFE is used in some aerosol lubricant sprays, including in micronized and polarized form. It is notable for its extremely low coefficient of friction, its hydrophobia (which serves to inhibit rust), and for the dry film it forms after application, which allows it to resist collecting particles that might otherwise form an abrasive paste. Brands include GT85.

Kitchen ware 
PTFE is best known for its use in coating non-stick frying pans and other cookware, as it is hydrophobic and possesses fairly high heat resistance.

The sole plates of some clothes irons are coated with PTFE.

Others 
Other niche applications include:
It is often found in ski bindings as a non-mechanical AFD (anti-friction device) 
It can be stretched to contain small pores of varying sizes and is then placed between fabric layers to make a waterproof, breathable fabric in outdoor apparel.
It is used widely as a fabric protector to repel stains on formal school-wear, like uniform blazers.
It is frequently used as a lubricant to prevent captive insects and other arthropods from escaping.
It is used as a coating for medical and healthcare applications formulated to provide strength and heat resistance to surgical devices and other medical equipment.  
It is used as a film interface patch for sports and medical applications, featuring a pressure-sensitive adhesive backing, which is installed in strategic high friction areas of footwear, insoles, ankle-foot orthosis, and other medical devices to prevent and relieve friction-induced blisters, calluses and foot ulceration.
Expanded PTFE membranes have been used in trials to assist trabeculectomy surgery to treat glaucoma.
Powdered PTFE is used in pyrotechnic compositions as an oxidizer with powdered metals such as aluminum and magnesium. Upon ignition, these mixtures form carbonaceous soot and the corresponding metal fluoride, and release large amounts of heat. They are used in infrared decoy flares and as igniters for solid-fuel rocket propellants. Aluminum and PTFE is also used in some thermobaric fuel compositions.
Powdered PTFE is used in a suspension with a low-viscosity, azeotropic mixture of siloxane ethers to create a lubricant for use in twisty puzzles.
In optical radiometry, sheets of PTFE are used as measuring heads in spectroradiometers and broadband radiometers (e.g., illuminance meters and UV radiometers) due to PTFE's capability to diffuse a transmitting light nearly perfectly. Moreover, optical properties of PTFE stay constant over a wide range of wavelengths, from UV down to near infrared. In this region, the ratio of its regular transmittance to diffuse transmittance is negligibly small, so light transmitted through a diffuser (PTFE sheet) radiates like Lambert's cosine law. Thus PTFE enables cosinusoidal angular response for a detector measuring the power of optical radiation at a surface, e.g. in solar irradiance measurements.
Teflon-coated bullets are coated with PTFE to reduce wear on the rifling of firearms that uncoated projectiles would cause. PTFE itself does not give a projectile an armor-piercing property.
Its high corrosion resistance makes PTFE useful in laboratory environments, where it is used for lining containers, as a coating for magnetic stirrers, and as tubing for highly corrosive chemicals such as hydrofluoric acid, which will dissolve glass containers. It is used in containers for storing fluoroantimonic acid, a superacid.
PTFE tubes are used in gas-gas heat exchangers in gas cleaning of waste incinerators. Unit power capacity is typically several megawatts.
PTFE is widely used as a thread seal tape in plumbing applications, largely replacing paste thread dope.
PTFE membrane filters are among the most efficient industrial air filters. PTFE-coated filters are often used in dust collection systems to collect particulate matter from air streams in applications involving high temperatures and high particulate loads such as coal-fired power plants, cement production and steel foundries. 
PTFE grafts can be used to bypass stenotic arteries in peripheral vascular disease if a suitable autologous vein graft is not available.
 Many bicycle lubricants and greases contain PTFE and are used on chains and other moving parts subjected to frictional forces (such as hub bearings).
 PTFE is used for some types of dental floss.
 PTFE can also be used when placing dental fillings, to isolate the contacts of the adjacent tooth so the restorative materials will not stick to the adjacent tooth.
 PTFE sheets are used in the production of butane hash oil due to its non-stick properties and resistance to non-polar solvents.
 PTFE, associated with a slightly textured laminate, makes the plain bearing system of a Dobsonian telescope.
 PTFE is widely used as a non-stick coating for food processing equipment; dough hoppers, mixing bowls, conveyor systems, rollers, and chutes. PTFE can also be reinforced where abrasion is present – for equipment processing seeded or grainy dough for example.
PTFE has been experimented with for electroless nickel plating.
PTFE tubing is used for Bowden tubing in 3D printers because its low friction allows the extruder stepper motor to push filament through it more easily.
PTFE is commonly used in aftermarket add-on mouse feet for gaming mice to reduce friction of the mouse against the mouse pad, resulting in a smoother glide.
PTFE foils are commonly used with laserprinters everywhere, in their fuser unit, wrapped around the heater element(s) and as well on the opposite pressure roller to prevent any kind of sticking to it (neither the printed paper nor toner waste)
PTFE is also used to make body jewellery as it's much safer to wear compared to materials like acrylic, that release toxics into the body at 26.6°C, unlike PTFE at 650–700°C.
PTFE is used to make bookbinding tools for folding, scoring and separating sheets of paper. These are typically referred to as Teflon bone folders.

Safety 
The main decomposition products are fluorocarbon gases and a sublimate, including tetrafluoroethylene (TFE) and difluorocarbene radicals (RCF2).

An animal study conducted in 1955 concluded that it is unlikely that these products would be generated in amounts significant to health at temperatures below . Above those temperatures the degradation by-products can be lethal to birds, and can cause flu-like symptoms in humans (polymer fume fever), although in humans those symptoms disappear within a day or two of being moved to fresh air.

Perfluorooctanoic acid (PFOA), a chemical formerly used in the manufacture of PTFE products such as non-stick coated cookware, can be carcinogenic for people who are exposed to it (see Ecotoxicity). Concerning levels of PFOA have been found in the blood of people who work in or live near factories where the chemical is used, and in people regularly exposed to PFOA-containing products such as some ski waxes and stain-resistant fabric coatings, but non-stick cookware was not found to be a major source of exposure, as the PFOA is burned off during the manufacturing process and not present in the finished product. Non-stick coated cookware has not been manufactured using PFOA since 2013, and PFOA is no longer being made in the United States.

Ecotoxicity

Trifluoroacetate
Sodium trifluoroacetate and the similar compound chlorodifluoroacetate can both be generated when PTFE undergoes thermolysis, as well as producing longer chain polyfluoro- and/or polychlorofluoro- (C3-C14) carboxylic acids which may be equally persistent. These products can accumulate in evaporative wetlands and have been found in the roots and seeds of wetland plant species, but has not been observed to have an adverse impact on plant health or germination success.

PFOA 

Perfluorooctanoic acid (PFOA, or C8) has been used as a surfactant in the emulsion polymerization of PTFE, although several manufacturers have entirely discontinued its use.

PFOA persists indefinitely in the environment. PFOA has been detected in the blood of many individuals of the general US population in the low and sub-parts per billion range, and levels are higher in chemical plant employees and surrounding subpopulations. PFOA and perfluorooctanesulfonic acid (PFOS) have been estimated to be in every American person’s blood stream in the parts per billion range, though those concentrations have decreased by 70% for PFOA and 84% for PFOS between 1999 and 2014, which coincides with the end of the production and phase out of PFOA and PFOS in the US. The general population has been exposed to PFOA through massive dumping of C8 waste into the ocean and near the Ohio River Valley. PFOA has been detected in industrial waste, stain-resistant carpets, carpet cleaning liquids, house dust, microwave popcorn bags, water, food and PTFE cookware.

As a result of a class-action lawsuit and community settlement with DuPont, three epidemiologists conducted studies on the population surrounding a chemical plant that was exposed to PFOA at levels greater than in the general population. The studies concluded that there was an association between PFOA exposure and six health outcomes: kidney cancer, testicular cancer, ulcerative colitis, thyroid disease, hypercholesterolemia (high cholesterol), and pregnancy-induced hypertension.

Overall, PTFE cookware is considered a minor exposure pathway to PFOA.

GenX

As a result of the lawsuits concerning the PFOA class-action lawsuit, DuPont began to use GenX, a similarly fluorinated compound, as a replacement for perfluorooctanoic acid in the manufacture of fluoropolymers, such as Teflon-brand PTFE. However, in lab tests on rats, GenX has been shown to cause many of the same health problems as PFOA.

The chemicals are manufactured by Chemours, a corporate spin-off of DuPont, in Fayetteville, North Carolina. While PFOA was phased out by 2014, Chemours was already found to be dumping GenX into the Cape Fear River in 2017, with the North Carolina Department of Environmental Quality (NCDEQ) ordering Chemours to halt discharges of all fluorinated compounds on September 5, 2017.

Similar polymers 

The Teflon trade name is also used for other polymers with similar compositions:

 Perfluoroalkoxy alkane (PFA)
 Fluorinated ethylene propylene (FEP)

These retain the useful PTFE properties of low friction and nonreactivity, but are also more easily formable.

See also 
 BS 4994, PTFE as a thermoplastic lining for dual laminate chemical process plant equipment
 Dark Waters, a film about litigation related to PFOA
 The Devil We Know, documentary on PFOA's health and environmental effects
 ETFE
 Gore-Tex waterproof fabric
 Magnesium/Teflon/Viton, pyrolant thermite composition
 Polymer adsorption
 Superhydrophobic coating
 Surface treatment of PTFE

Notes

References

Further reading

External links 
 Plasma Processes and Adhesive Bonding of Polytetrafluoroethylene
 PTFE (polytetrafluoroethylene) (Properties) | Fluorotherm.com

American inventions
Biomaterials
Dielectrics
Dry lubricants
DuPont
DuPont products
Fluorocarbons
Fluoropolymers
Plastics
Pyrotechnic oxidizers
Roofing materials
Engineering plastic